Prestolee Aqueduct is a stone-built aqueduct in Prestolee, Kearsley in the Metropolitan Borough of Bolton, Greater Manchester, England.  The four-arch structure was constructed in 1793 to carry the Manchester, Bolton and Bury Canal across the River Irwell. It is now preserved as a Grade II listed building.

The aqueduct is one of two remaining major structures on the canal, the other being the Clifton Aqueduct. A third major aqueduct, Damside Aqueduct, was demolished in the 1950s.

As of 2007, the aqueduct still carried water, although it was not navigable as adjoining sections of the canal are in need of restoration.

See also

List of aqueducts
List of canal aqueducts in the United Kingdom

References

External links
Prestolee Aqueduct on Pennine Waterways website

Grade II listed bridges in Greater Manchester
Bridges completed in 1793
Navigable aqueducts in England
Grade II listed canals
1793 establishments in England
Bridges across the River Irwell